Zaluzianskya pumila is a species of flowering plant in the genus Zaluzianskya. It is endemic to the Northern Cape and Western Cape.

Conservation status 
Zaluzianskya pumila is classified as Least Concern as the population is stable.

References

External links 
 

Endemic flora of South Africa
Flora of South Africa
Flora of the Cape Provinces
Scrophulariaceae